Larson Air Force Base is a former United States Air Force base located five miles (8 km) northwest of the central business district (CBD) of Moses Lake, in Grant County, Washington. After its closure in 1966, the airport facility became Grant County International Airport.

History

World War II
Originally named Moses Lake Army Air Base, the airfield was activated on 24 November 1942 as a temporary World War II training center.  Moses Lake AAB was a sub-base of Spokane Air Technical Service Command, headquartered at Spokane Army Airfield.

The first operational training unit (OTU) at the base was the 482d Fighter Squadron, which conducted twin-engine fighter training for P-38 Lightning fighters.  On 5 April 1943, the 396th Bombardment Group became a second OTU at the base, providing first phase heavy bomber training for the B-17 Flying Fortress with its 592d Bombardment Squadron, 593d Bombardment Squadron, 594th Bombardment Squadron and 595th Bombardment Squadrons.

The first flight of the XB-47 took place on 17 Dec. 1947, originating at Boeing Field and terminating at Moses Lake Air Force Base.  In Feb. 1949, a B-47 took off from Larson, headed east and "broke all coast-to-coast speed records" with an average speed of 607.8 miles per hour.

Air Defense Command
Moses Lake AFB reopened as a permanent installation on 26 August 1948, being transferred from Air Materiel Command to the Air Defense Command (ADC). The initial ADC base operating unit was the 2755th Air Base Squadron.  Under ADC, the base came under the Western Air Defense Force, headquartered at Hamilton AFB, California.

The base was renamed Larson Air Force Base was named in honor of Major Donald A. Larson, USAAF, in May 1950.
Born and raised in Yakima, Washington, Larson was a fighter pilot and ace who flew 57 combat missions in Europe during World War II. He was killed in action while assigned to the VIII Fighter Command 505th Fighter Squadron. Larson's P-51D Mustang (AAF Ser. No. 44-13881, nose-name "Mary, Queen of Scotts") was shot down and crashed on 4 August 1944 near Uelzen, Germany.

Interceptors
The primary mission of Larson-based ADC aircraft was to protect the secret Hanford Atomic Works and the Grand Coulee Dam.

The first ADC flying unit to arrive was the 325th Fighter-Interceptor Group, which arrived on 26 November 1948.  The mission of the 325th FIG was to conduct ADC's All Weather Combat Crew Training School. Its operational component, the 317th Fighter Interceptor Squadron, initially flew Northrop P-61 Black Widows, almost immediately transitioning to the North American F-82 Twin Mustang.  A second squadron, the 319th Fighter Interceptor Squadron arrived on 2 September 1949, being reassigned from McChord AFB.  The 319th also flew the F-82 Twin Mustang. The 325th FIG remained at Moses Lake until being reassigned to McChord AFB on 23 April 1950, along with the 317th FIS.  The 319th remained until 9 February 1952 when it was reassigned to Suwon Air Base, South Korea flying F-94 Starfires.

The next ADC unit was the 81st Fighter-Interceptor Wing which arrived from 10 November 1949.  The 81st FIW flew F-51D/H Mustangs, F-80C Shooting Stars and North American F-86 Sabres from the base.  The 81st remained until 5 September 1951 when it was reassigned to NATO and deployed to RAF Shepherds Grove in the United Kingdom. During the Korean War, the 116th Fighter-Interceptor Squadron, Washington Air National Guard was called to active duty and activated at Moses Lake.  The 116th FIS was deployed as part of the 81st Tactical Fighter Wing to RAF Shepherds Grove.

Tactical Air Command
On 21 April 1952, Larson AFB was assigned to the Tactical Air Command (TAC) under TAC's Eighteenth Air Force, which reassigned the 62nd Troop Carrier Wing from McChord AFB, Washington to the base.

Strategic Air Command
On 15 April 1952, the YB-52 made its initial flight from Boeing Field to Larson Air Force Base, piloted by Tex Johnston and Col. Townsend.  Johnston noted, "At three hours and eight minutes, the flight in the YB-52 was the longest-duration maiden flight in the history of aviation and introduced one of the world's great airplanes."

In 1960, control of Larson AFB passed from TAC to Strategic Air Command (SAC) with the 4170th Strategic Wing as the host unit.  In 1963, the 4170th was redesignated as the 462d Strategic Aerospace Wing with B-52E Stratofortress and KC-135A Stratotanker aircraft.

Civil use
With the closure of the Larson AFB in 1966, Colonel Owen retired from the Air Force and became the first director of the Port of Moses Lake, overseeing the transfer of the property from the U.S. Government to Grant County International Airport.

Following the Air Force's departure in 1966, the airfield has continued to support operations from McChord's 62d Airlift Wing over the years, as the wing's Lockheed C-141 Starlifter, Lockheed C-130 Hercules, and currently Boeing C-17 Globemaster III aircraft have practiced approaches and both normal landings and tactical assault landings on a regular basis.

The 92nd Air Refueling Wing at Fairchild Air Force Base in Spokane temporarily moved its KC-135 R/T fleet and operations to Moses Lake in 2011 while Fairchild's runway underwent reconstruction and other infrastructure improvements, to include an upgrade to the base's aviation fuel distribution system.

For over four decades, Japan Air Lines trained its 747 crews at the facility, until 2009.

Previous names
 Moses Lake Army Air Base, 1942–1945
 Moses Lake Air Force Base, 1948–1950
 Larson Air Force Base, 1950–1966

Major commands to which assigned
 Fourth Air Force, 1942–1943
 II Bomber Command, 1943–1945
 Air Defense Command, 1948–1952
 Tactical Air Command, 1952–1957
 Military Air Transport Service, 1957–1960
 Strategic Air Command, 1960–1966

Major units assigned
 482d Fighter Squadron, 1942–1943
 396th Bombardment Group, 1943–1945
 325th Fighter-Interceptor Group, 1948–1950
 81st Fighter-Interceptor Wing, 1949–1951
 62d Troop Carrier Wing, 1952–1960
 71st Strategic Reconnaissance Wing, 1955–1957
 4170th Strategic Wing, 1960
 Redesignated 462d Strategic Aerospace Wing, 1963–1966.

Air Defense Command units
Known ADC units and squadrons assigned to Larson were:

 82d Fighter Interceptor Squadron (6 February 1952 – 1 April 1953) (F-94B Starfire)
 Assigned to: 4702d Defense Wing
 Reassigned from:  Hamilton AFB, California
 Reassigned to: MATS Iceland Air Defense Force at NAS Keflavik, Iceland
 31st Fighter-Interceptor Squadron (20 April 1953 – 18 August 1955) (F-86D Sabre)
 Activated at Larson to replace 82d Fighter-Interceptor Squadron
 Assigned to: 4702d Air Defense Wing, 20 April 1953
 Reassigned to: 84th Fighter Group (Air Defense) at Wurtsmith AFB, Michigan
 322d Fighter-Interceptor Squadron (18 August 1955 – 1 April 1959) (F-86D Sabre)
 Activated at Larson to replace 31st Fighter-Interceptor Squadron
 Assigned to: 9th Air Division, 18 August 1955 – 1 December 1956
 Assigned to: 4721st Air Defense Group, 1 December 1956 – 1 April 1959
 Reassigned to: Kingsley Field, Oregon upon SAC taking control of Larson AFB.

 323d Fighter-Interceptor Squadron (26 November 1952 – 18 August 1955) (F-86D Sabre)
 Assigned to: 4794th Air Defense Wing 26 November 1952 – 19 January 1953
 Assigned to: 4702d Air Defense Wing, 19 January 1953 – 8 October 1954
 Assigned to: 9th Air Division, 8 October 1954 – 18 August 1955
 Activated at Larson AFB
 Reassigned to: 84th Fighter Group (Air Defense) at Truax Field, Wisconsin
538th Fighter-Interceptor Squadron (18 August 1955 – 1 July 1960) (F-86D/L Sabre, F-104A/B Starfighter (1958–1960))
 Activated at Larson to replace 323d Fighter-Interceptor Squadron
 Assigned to: 9th Air Division, 18 August 1955 – 1 December 1956
 Assigned to: 4721st Air Defense Group, 1 December 1956
 Assigned to: 4700th Air Defense Wing, 1 May 1959
 Assigned to: Spokane Air Defense Sector, 15 May –  1 July 1960
 Discontinued upon SAC taking control of Larson AFB.

Intercontinental ballistic missile facilities

The 568th Strategic Missile Squadron Operated three HGM-25A Titan I ICBM sites: (1 Apr 1961 – 25 Mar 1965) 
 568-A, 8 miles N of Schrag, Washington            
 568-B, 4 miles SSW of Warden, Washington          
 568-C, 6 miles SE of Frenchman Hills, Washington  

The Titan I ICBM program at Larson was initiated in 1959 when the Walla Walla District of the Army Corps of Engineers set up an area office in October. The contractor broke ground on 1 December 1959 and the sites were turned over to SAC in early April 1961. In May 1964 Secretary of Defense Robert McNamara directed that the phase-out of the Atlas and Titan I missiles be accelerated, and in January 1965 the missiles of the 568th were taken off operational alert. The squadron was inactivated 2 months later.

Today, site "A" appears to be largely intact, the owner has the facility for sale.  Photos of the interior show it to be in good condition. Site "B" appears to be largely cleared, the silo launch doors of two pads appear to be open, and is also apparently also for sale. Site "C" appears to be a scrap site, filled with clutter; its underground facilities apparently are flooded by groundwater.

See also

 Washington World War II Army Airfields
 List of USAF Aerospace Defense Command General Surveillance Radar Stations

References

 Maurer, Maurer. Air Force Combat Units of World War II. Washington, DC: United States Government Printing Office 1961 (republished 1983, Office of Air Force History).
 Ravenstein, Charles A. Air Force Combat Wings Lineage and Honors Histories 1947–1977. Maxwell Air Force Base, Alabama: Office of Air Force History 1984. .
 Mueller, Robert (1989). Volume 1: Active Air Force Bases Within the United States of America on 17 September 1982.
  A Handbook of Aerospace Defense Organization 1946 – 1980, by Lloyd H. Cornett and Mildred W. Johnson, Office of History, Aerospace Defense Center, Peterson Air Force Base, Colorado
 Winkler, David F. (1997), Searching the skies: the legacy of the United States Cold War defense radar program. Prepared for United States Air Force Headquarters Air Combat Command.
 Information for Larson AFB SAGE, WA

External links
 Grant County International Airport (Port of Moses Lake)
 Larson Air Force Base – Grant County International Airport at HistoryLink
 Strategic-Air-Command.com – Larson AFB history
 Global Security.org – Larson AFB
 Center for Columbia River History: Larson AFB

Installations of the United States Air Force in Washington (state)
Buildings and structures in Grant County, Washington
Semi-Automatic Ground Environment sites
Installations of Strategic Air Command
Military installations closed in 1966
1942 establishments in Washington (state)
1966 disestablishments in Washington (state)
Moses Lake, Washington